The following is a list of films originally produced and/or distributed theatrically by Paramount Pictures and released in the 2000s.

References

External links
 Paramount Pictures Complete Library

 2000-2009
American films by studio
2000s in American cinema
Lists of 2000s films